Billy Porter (July 1905 – 28 April 1946) was an English footballer. His regular position was at full back. He was born in Fleetwood, Lancashire. He played for Windsor Villa, Fleetwood Town, Oldham Athletic, Manchester United and Hyde United, as well as guesting for several teams during the Second World War.

External links
MUFCInfo.com profile

1905 births
People from Fleetwood
1946 deaths
English footballers
Oldham Athletic A.F.C. players
Manchester United F.C. players
Fleetwood Town F.C. players
Hyde United F.C. players
Hyde United F.C. managers
Association football defenders
English football managers